Khem Prasad Lohani is a Nepali politician and a member of the House of Representatives of the federal parliament of Nepal. He was elected under the first-past-the-post (FPTP) system representing CPN UML of the left alliance from Dhading-2 constituency. He defeated his closest rival Dilman Pakhrin of Nepali Congress by acquiring 36,654 votes to Pakhrin's 36,015. This was the first time he was elected to parliament.

References

Living people
Place of birth missing (living people)
Nepal MPs 2017–2022
Nepal Communist Party (NCP) politicians
Communist Party of Nepal (Unified Marxist–Leninist) politicians
1962 births